Kim Kyong-hun (born 11 August 1990) is a North Korean footballer who plays as a defender for Kyonggongop and the North Korea national team.

Career
Kim was included in North Korea's squad for the 2019 AFC Asian Cup in the United Arab Emirates.

Career statistics

International

References

External links
 
 Kim Kyong-hun  at WorldFootball.com
 Kim Kyong-hun  at CambodianFootball.com
 Kim Kyong-hun at DPRKFootball

1990 births
Living people
People from Wonsan
North Korean footballers
North Korea international footballers
North Korean expatriate footballers
Expatriate footballers in Cambodia
Association football defenders
Rimyongsu Sports Club players
Kyonggongopsong Sports Club players
2019 AFC Asian Cup players